Jean-Paul Salomé (born 14 September 1960) is a French director and screenwriter.

Filmography

References

External links

 

1960 births
Living people
Film directors from Paris
French male screenwriters
French screenwriters